Charles Amédée Schlumberger (19 May 1893 – 1984) was a Swiss equestrian. He competed in the individual dressage event at the 1924 Summer Olympics.

References

External links
 
 
 

1893 births
1984 deaths
Swiss male equestrians
Olympic equestrians of Switzerland
Equestrians at the 1924 Summer Olympics
Sportspeople from Basel-Stadt